Ukrainian People's Party has several editions:
Ukrainian People's Party (1902) was a nationalist party of Mykola Mikhnovsky that was liquidated in 1907.
Ukrainian People's Party (2002) is a modern political party of national-democratic direction of Yuri Kostenko.